Layeh (also Romanized as Lāyeh, Layah, and Layyeh; also known as Layakh) is a village in Kalisham Rural District, Amarlu District, Rudbar County, Gilan Province, Iran. At the 2006 census, its population was 181, in 47 families.

References 

Populated places in Rudbar County